Alice Frost (August 1, 1910 – January 6, 1998) was an American actress. An inaugural member of Orson Welles's Mercury Theatre on radio and the stage, she later performed the role of Pamela North on the radio series Mr. and Mrs. North for nearly 10 years.

Early years
Alice Dorothy Margaret Frost was born on August 1, 1910, in Minneapolis, Minnesota. She was the youngest of four children.  Her father, Rev. John A. Frost, was a Swedish immigrant and served as a minister in the Lutheran church in Mora, Minnesota, and her mother was the church's organist. She attended high school in Mora and was active with the school's newspaper, glee club, drama society, and debate society. She enrolled at the University of Minnesota but had to drop out after her father's death. Later, she studied dramatics and voice for two years at the MacPhail School of Music in Minneapolis, Minnesota.

Frost also worked in a department store's credit department.

Radio

Frost debuted on radio at age 16 as a singer, participating in a duet with a friend on a Minneapolis station. By 1933, she was a member of the cast of The Criminal Court. In 1934, she was "one of the ghost voices during CBS-WABC's Forty-Five Minutes In Hollywood." She was an inaugural member of Orson Welles's Mercury Theatre, on radio and on the stage, and was one of his favorite actresses.

An item in a 1939 newspaper noted Frost's "art of mimicry," saying "Alice is known to her friends as 'the girl of a hundred voices'"—a talent which originated from her childhood, when she heard ministers who visited her home "when they returned from their missions in far-off places like Siam, India or Japan... [T]he missionaries delighted in teaching the little girl their various Hindustani, Javanese or Far Eastern dialects." By 1938, she had already played "more than thirty different types of roles." An item in a 1937 newspaper reported: "It's nothing unusual for her to appear in as many as eight network shows in a week, each one calling for a different role. In quick succession, she has been a comedienne, a tragedian, an ingenue, a mother, a daughter and a witch!"

In the 1930s, Frost was "hostess, secretary, heckler and general all-around actress each Sunday" on Stoopnagle and Budd. Late in that decade, she appeared regularly on Melody and Madness and Undercover Squad.

In 1941, Frost starred in Are You a Missing Heir?. Her other roles as a regular cast member included those show in the table below.

She also was heard in Song of the Stranger, The Shadow, Grand Central Station, The Campbell Playhouse, What Would You Have Done,  On Broadway, Famous Jury Trials, Al Pearce and His Gang, David Harum, Lorenzo Jones, Suspense, Aunt Jenny's Real Life Stories,  The Fat Man, Romance, The Big Story, Les Misérables, The Mercury Theatre on the Air, Mr. District Attorney, Johnny Presents, The FBI in Peace and War, Don Ameche's True Life Stories, and Columbia Workshop.

Stage

In 1928, Frost appeared on stage in Chautauqua performances, playing Lorelei in Gentlemen Prefer Blondes. A year later, she was part of a stock theater company in Miami.

In 1932, she appeared in It's the Law, a farce presented at the Ritz Theater in Scranton, Pennsylvania.

She appeared on Broadway in Green Grow the Lilacs (1931), The Great Lover (1932), As Husbands Go (1933), It's a Wise Child (1933), the Mercury Theatre productions Caesar (1937–38) and The Shoemaker's Holiday (1938), A Roomful of Roses (1955), and The Bad Seed (1955).

In 1967, Frost co-starred with Jack Bailey in a four-week production of Ah, Wilderness! at the Pasadena Playhouse.

Film
Frost had a role in the independent film Damaged Love in 1930. She worked for the Independent Eastern Pictures company.

Television
Frost played Mama Holstrom in 10 episodes of The Farmer's Daughter and Trina on Mama. She appeared in two episodes of Hazel and also had the role of Miss Bickle in the unsold pilot of the comedy His Model Wife. She was also seen on Gunsmoke, Goodyear Theatre, Bus Stop, and The Alcoa Hour.

In the 1960s, Frost appeared in two episodes of The Twilight Zone ("The Sixteen-Millimeter Shrine" and "It's a Good Life"). She also found roles in the decade's popular Westerns, appearing on The Tall Man, The Virginian and in two episodes of both Bonanza and Wagon Train. As the Westerns gave way to the police and detective dramas of the 1970s, Frost found work on such series as Ironside, Adam-12, Police Woman, and Baretta.

Frost's final television work included a 1978 visit to Fantasy Island and a last role in a 1979 episode of Buck Rogers in the 25th Century. That final role brought Frost full circle, as the character of Buck Rogers also first found fame in the 1930s.

Recognition
Frost was named the winner in the Radio category among America's 13 Best Dressed Women for 1941. Winners were "selected in an annual poll of 100 leading designers for the Fashion Academy Awards."

Death
Frost died on January 6, 1998, in Naples, Florida, aged 87.

References

External links
 

1910 births
1998 deaths
Actresses from Minneapolis
American radio actresses
American television actresses
20th-century American actresses
People from Mora, Minnesota
American stage actresses
American Lutherans